Let's Play is an album by American jazz pianist Larry Willis recorded in 1991 and released on the SteepleChase label.

Track listing
All compositions by Larry Willis except where noted
 "I Hear a Rhapsody" (George Fragos, Jack Baker, Dick Gasparre) – 9:05
 "Who Can I Turn To?" (Anthony Newley, Leslie Bricusse) – 6:45
 "Let's Play" – 11:54
 "No Blues" (Miles Davis) – 7:28
 "Anne" (Santi Debriano) – 6:32
 "The Children of Harlem" – 8:58
 "Bess, You Is My Woman Now" (George Gershwin, Ira Gershwin) – 8:17
 "Nardis" (Miles Davis) – 7:32

Personnel
Larry Willis – piano
Santi Debriano – bass
Victor Lewis – drums

References

SteepleChase Records albums
Larry Willis albums
1991 albums